Uğur Yücel (born 26 May 1957) is a Turkish film actor, producer and director. He graduated from the Theater Department of the Istanbul Municipality Conservatory (İstanbul Belediye Konservatuarı Tiyatro Bölümü). He took part in several plays between 1975 and 1984 in Kenter Tiyatrosu (Kenter Theatre), Tef Kabare Theatre, Dormen Theatre, and Şan Müzikholü. He was noticed for his roles in Selamsız Bandosu (1987) and Muhsin Bey (1987), then gained mainstream success when he took part in Eşkıya (1996).

Filmography

Actor 
 1984 – Fahriye Abla
 1985 – Aşık Oldum
 1986 – Teyzem
 1986 – Milyarder
 1987 – Selamsız Bandosu
 1987 – Muhsin Bey
 1988 – Arabesk
 1994 – Aziz Ahmet
 1996 – Eşkıya
 2000 – Balalayka
 2001 – Karanlıkta Koşanlar
 2003 – Alacakaranlık
 2005 – Hırsız Polis
 2008 – New York, I Love You
 2008 – Canım Ailem
 2009 – Soul Kitchen
 2010 – Ejder Kapanı
 2012 – Aşk ve Ceza
 2013 – Benim Dünyam
 2013 – Aramızda Kalsın
 2014 – Soğuk
 2015 – Yaktın Beni
 2015 – Kötü Kedi Şerafettin
 2016 – Familya
 2017 – İçerde
 2018 – Nefes Nefese
 2018 – Muhteşem İkili
 2019 – Yüzleşme
 2019 – Cinayet Süsü
 2021 – Kırmızı Oda
 2021 – Fatma
 2021 – Eşkıya Dünyaya Hükümdar Olmaz
 2022 – Uysallar
 2022 – Hakim

Director
 1999 – İkinci Bahar
 2001 – Karanlıkta Koşanlar
 2003 – Yazı Tura
 2006 – Hayatımın Kadınısın
 2010 – Ejder Kapanı
 2013 – Benim Dünyam	
 2014 – Soğuk

Producer
 2003 – Alacakaranlık
 2003 – Yazı Tura

Screenwriter
 1994 – Aziz Ahmet
 2001 – Karanlıkta Koşanlar
 2003 – Yazı Tura
 2006 – Hayatımın Kadınısın
 2014 – Soğuk

Music
 1998 – Gemide
 1998 – Laleli'de Bir Azize

Editor
 2003 – Yazı Tura

Awards
 1987 – 24. Antalya Film Şenliği (Antalya Film Festival), Muhsin Bey, Best actor
 2004 – 41. Antalya Film Şenliği (Antalya Film Festival), Yazı Tura, Best film
 2004 – 41. Antalya Film Şenliği (Antalya Film Festival), Yazı Tura, Best screenplay
 2004 – 41. Antalya Film Şenliği (Antalya Film Festival), Yazı Tura, Best director
 2005 – 16. Ankara Film Festivali (Ankara Film Festival)]], Yazı Tura, Mahmut Tali Öngören special award
 2005 – Nürnberg Türkiye/Almanya Film Festivali, Yazı Tura, Best film
 2005 – 24. İstanbul Film Festivali (Istanbul Film Festival), Yazı Tura, Best director
 2005 – 24. İstanbul Film Festivali (İstanbul Film Festival), Yazı Tura, Public jury award
 2005 – 12. Adana Altın Koza Film Şenliği, Yazı Tura, Best director

External links
 

 Photographs
 Picture
 Picture (right)

1957 births
Best Director Golden Boll Award winners
Best Director Golden Orange Award winners
Best Screenplay Golden Orange Award winners
Best Supporting Actor Golden Orange Award winners
Living people
Film people from Istanbul
Turkish male film actors
Turkish film directors
Turkish male screenwriters
Turkish male television actors